"Champione" is the 6th single from the Japanese band Orange Range. It was used as the theme song for the Japanese broadcast of the 2006 FIFA World Cup in Germany. The B-Side song "Walk On" was used as the ending theme song for the Japanese movie Check it out yo!. Many fans find this single to be notable because three of the band members forgot their lyrics on stage while performing it for the first time.

Track listing
 "Champione" (チャンピオーネ)
 "Walk on"

Charts

Oricon chart (Japan)

Orange Range songs
2006 singles
Oricon Weekly number-one singles
FIFA World Cup songs
2006 songs